The Reformed Church in Nieuw-Lekkerland is the biggest and oldest church in Nieuw-Lekkerland, Netherlands. The church was built in 1848, but it is nearly sure that there was a church before. The architect was D. Slingerland. There are 1.125 seats. The pulpit is from the 17th century.

Ministers 
 W. Hovius 1961-1966
 Tjitze de Jong 1969-1974
 W. Verboom 1978-1983
 H. Penning 1984-1992
 C. van den Berg 1992-1997
 J. Belder 1997-2002
 J. van den Berg 2002-2008
 J. Volk 2002-2007
 J. Zuijderduijn 2007-2013
 E. Gouda 2009-

References

External links 
  Website of Reformed Church Nieuw-Lekkerland

19th-century Calvinist and Reformed churches
Churches in South Holland
Dutch Reformed Church buildings
Churches completed in 1848
Molenlanden
Reformed church buildings in the Netherlands
19th-century churches in the Netherlands